Queenie McKenzie (Nakarra) (formerly Oakes, or Mingmarriya) (c. 1915 – 16 November 1998) was an Aboriginal Australian artist. She was born on Old Texas Station, on the western bank of the Ord River in the East Kimberley.

Early life 

McKenzie's mother was Malngin and Gurundji and her father was a white horse-breaker.

Under the existing policy during the time of her youth, McKenzie was at risk of removal by the government to an institution, as was the fate of many Aboriginal children with mixed parentage at the time. Her mother, however, prevented the displacement of her child by reportedly blackening her skin with charcoal, and the young girl grew up working for the stockmen of the cattle station at Texas Downs.

McKenzie lived her entire life in the Shire of Wyndham-East Kimberley, knew the landscape intimately, and is quoted as saying: "Every rock, every hill, every water, I know that place backwards and forwards, up and down, inside out. It's my country and I got names for every place". McKenzie took two Aboriginal names, once stating, "my name been grow up from these hills". Mingmarriya references the country near Dingo Springs on Texas Downs Station east of Warmun (Turkey Creek), Western Australia where the artist lived and painted.

Career 

McKenzie benefited from the Waringarri Aboriginal Arts Corporation.
In 1993, former Arts Minister Peter Foss stated about the organization, "This organisation is doing an enormous amount to ensure that Aboriginal art is respected in terms of copyright and moral rights, and that Aboriginal artists are recompensed properly for their work".

A painting by McKenzie depicting the Mistake Creek massacre was bought by the National Museum of Australia in 2005, but due to controversy over the facts of the event, part of the History Wars, it had never been hung. From July 2020 it was put on display as part of a new exhibition titled "Talking Blak to History" at the Museum.

Major collections 

 Holmes à Court Collection

Commercial success 

McKenzie's art remains among Australia's most collectible. Her works have sold at auction for $8000 to $92000. McKenzie has also been consistently included within the Australian Indigenous Art Market top 100 index, ranking 21st in 2014.

Legacy 

Throughout the final years of McKenzie's life, the artist exhibited concern for the cultural future of her community, and wished for the Texas Downs station to be returned to the Texas Mob. Though she died before witnessing her wishes manifest, McKenzie's importance has been recognized by the government of Western Australia, which declared her as a "State Living Treasure" the year of her death.

McKenzie was included in the Moorditj-Australian Indigenous Cultural Expressions CD-ROM, along with other Western Australian artists Jack Davis, Alma Toomath, Betty Egan, Michele Broun, the Pigram Brothers, Footprince, Wayne Barker, Sally Morgan, Jimmy Chi and Mary Pantjiti McLean.

In Western Australia, all pastoral land leases are up for renewal or surrender in 2015, including the Texas Downs station.

McKenzie was cited as an important influence on the work of the Australian ceramic artist Pippin Drysdale.

References

External links 

 Queenie McKenzie at the Art Gallery of New South Wales
 Example of a work by Queenie Nakarra, 2004, in the National Museum of Australia.

1910s births
1998 deaths
Australian Aboriginal artists
Indigenous Australians from Western Australia
Australian women painters
People from Warmun Community
20th-century Australian painters
20th-century Australian women artists